James N. Rosenau (November 25, 1924 – September 9, 2011) was an American political scientist and international affairs scholar. He served as president of the International Studies Association from 1984 to 1985.

Life
His scholarship and teaching focused on the dynamics of world politics and the overlap between domestic and foreign affairs. He was the author of scores of articles and more than 35 books, including Turbulence in World Politics: A Theory of Change and Continuity (Princeton University Press, 1990) and Along the Domestic-Foreign Frontier: Exploring Governance in a Turbulent World (Cambridge, 1997). His book Distant Proximities: Dynamics Beyond Globalization completed a trio on globalization, and was published by Princeton University Press in 2003.

Rosenau was among the first to apply Complexity Science, an interdisciplinary system of analysis with origins in the hard sciences, to political science and international affairs. A November/December 2005 publication in Foreign Policy magazine listed Rosenau as among the most influential scholars in the field of International Affairs.

Arriving at the University of Southern California Dornsife in 1973, Rosenau served as director of the USC School of International Relations from 1976 to 1979. He left USC Dornsife in 1992 and was appointed University Professor of International Affairs at George Washington University in Washington, D.C. Rosenau then served as University Professor of International Affairs at the George Washington University's Elliott School of International Affairs until his death in 2011. He was a Democrat.

His final book, "People Count! The Networked Individual in World Politics" was published in October 2007.

External links
Obituary in the USC News
Web page at GWU
Obituary in the GW Hatchet

1924 births
2011 deaths
University of Southern California faculty
Elliott School of International Affairs faculty
George Washington University faculty
American foreign policy writers
American male non-fiction writers
American political writers